Derviš Korkut (5 May 1888 – 28 August 1969) was a Bosnian librarian, teacher, humanist and orientalist. He is the brother of the famous Bosnian translator of the Quran, Besim Korkut.

Derviš Korkut is remembered as the curator of the National Museum of Bosnia and Herzegovina who saved the Sarajevo Haggadah from the Nazi army during World War II, as confirmed by people close to Korkut in 1942, he saved Mira Papo, a Jewish girl, by bringing her into his family and hiding her true identity. After not joining the fascist organization during the war, he did not want to join the Communist Party after the war and was sentenced to several years in prison. After serving six of eight years in the Zenica prison, he was released, but his civil rights were never restored. After his release until the end of his life he worked as curator of the Museum of the City of Sarajevo. He died on 28 August 1969. Together with his wife, Serveta Ljuž, he was proclaimed Righteous among the Nations by Yad Vashem in 1999.

Biography 
Korkut was born on 5 May 1888 in Travnik to father Ahmed Munib Korkut and mother Šahida (née Biščević). He came from a well-known family of Ulema, who moved to Bosnia from Turkey during the 16th century. He had four brothers and five sisters. He graduated from Sarajevo High School in 1909, after which he went to study in Istanbul and at the Sorbonne. He spoke Turkish, Arabic, French and German.

Korkut graduated from the Theological College of Istanbul in 1914. Although he was discharged as a priest, he was mobilized into the Austro-Hungarian army in July 1917 as a military imam at the rank of II Class captain.

From July 1916 to January 1921, Korkut worked as a religious teacher at the Men's Teacher Training School in Derventa, after which he was for some time the economic prefect of the District Madrasa in Sarajevo. He worked as a chief in the Muslim section of the Ministry of Religions in Belgrade from 1921 to 1923, when he was forced to resign due to pressure from members of the People's Radical Party.

From September 1923 to October 1925 he was Secretary of the Yugoslav Muslim People's Organization, gathered around Ibrahim Maglajlić. From 1927 until his appointment for the Travnik mufti in September 1929, he worked as curator of the National Museum. The Law on the Islamic Religious Community later abolished the muftis of Travnik and Bihać. Until 1937 he worked as a curator of the Cetinje Museum and at the Supreme Command of the Islamic Religious Community.

From 1937 to 1944 Korkut again worked as curator of the National Museum. In 1940 he married Serveta Ljuža, an Albanian from Kosovska Mitrovica. With her, Korkut had three children, a son Munib, and two daughters Abida and Lamija.

During World War II, Korkut was able to hide the Sarajevo haggadah from a German occupier and save the girl Mira Papo, which is why he was proclaimed Righteous Among the Nations with his wife in 1999. His wife Serveta told journalists she remembered her husband Derviš bringing home the Haggadah, and soon after coming with a young Jewish girl, Mira Papo: "I gave her my veil, so she could hide from the Nazis while staying with us", she told Nacional in 2009.

With his brother Besim, Derviš Korkut was one of the signatories to the Sarajevo resolution condemning crimes against Serbs and Jews. He contributed to an expert study claiming that the Roma are "Aryan" and that so-called "White Gypsies" were an integral part of the Bosniak people, which is why the Ministry of the Interior of the Nazi-puppet Independent State of Croatia in August 1941 ordered the suspension of the persecution of the Roma.

Even so, after the war, Derviš Korkut was declared a "collaborator of the occupiers" in a rigged trial, for which he was sentenced to eight years in prison. He served six years in Zenica Prison; he was then released, but his civil rights were never restored. From release until the end of his life Derviš Korkut worked as curator of the Museum of the City of Sarajevo. He died on 28 August 1969. His wife lived until 9 September 2013, dying at the age of 92.

In his scholarly work Derviš Korkut was most interested in and wrote about the minorities in Bosnia and Herzegovina: Jews and Albanians. He has written in: "La Tribune des Peuples", "L'Abstinence", "Gajret", "Pravda" (Justice), "Iršad", "Večernja pošta", "Glasnik Saveza trezvene mladosti" (Newsletter of the Union of sober youth), "Glasnik Zemaljskog muzeja" (Newsletter of the National Museum), "Narodna starina" (National Antiquity), Cetinje's "Zapisi", "Novi behar" and others. In his works he mainly dealt with the period of Ottoman rule. He was also involved in philology, especially collecting turcisms in the Bosnian language. From 1933 to 1936 he was the editor of "Glasnik IVZ" (Gazette of the Islamic Religious Community).

Notes

Bibliography 

 Bejtić, Alija (1974). Derviš M. Korkut kao kulturni i javni radnik. Sarajevo: Oslobođenje.
 Hadžijahić, Muhamed (1972). Osvrti – In memoriam (Anali Gazi Husrev-begove biblioteke). Sarajevo: Gazi Husrev-begova biblioteka.
 Nametak, Alija (2004). Sarajevski nekrologij. Sarajevo: Civitas.

External links 

 Read the spirit
 Geraldine Brooks, The Book of Exodus. A double rescue in wartime Sarajevo, The New Yorker, November 25, 2007

1888 births
1969 deaths
People from Travnik
Bosniaks of Bosnia and Herzegovina
Bosnia and Herzegovina people of Turkish descent
Yugoslav non-fiction writers
Librarians
Orientalists
Anti-fascism in Yugoslavia
Muslim Righteous Among the Nations
Yugoslav Righteous Among the Nations